Qvist is a surname of Scandinavian origin. People with the surname include:

 Anders Qvist (born 1987), Danish professional football defender
 Arthur Qvist (1896–1973), Norwegian horse rider and Olympic athlete; also Norwegian Commander of the Norwegian Volunteer SS Legion in World War II
 Eetu Qvist (born 1983), Finnish former ice hockey player
 Gabriella Qvist (born 2003), Danish curler
 Lasse Qvist (born 1987), Danish football player
 Mikael Qvist, Danish curler and coach
 Ole Qvist (born 1950), former Danish international footballer
 Trine Qvist (born 1966), Danish curler and Olympic medalist

See also

 Quist (surname)
 Kvist (surname)

Swedish-language surnames
Danish-language surnames